Lukáš Květoň (born May 3, 1982) is a Czech former professional ice hockey player.

He played with HC České Budějovice in the Czech Extraliga from 2002 to 2013.

Květoň previously played for HK Hradec Králové, Piráti Chomutov and HC Dukla Jihlava.

References

External links 
 

1982 births
Living people
Motor České Budějovice players
Czech ice hockey forwards
Stadion Hradec Králové players
HC Dukla Jihlava players
KLH Vajgar Jindřichův Hradec players
People from Tábor
Piráti Chomutov players
IHC Písek players
SK Horácká Slavia Třebíč players
HC Tábor players
Sportspeople from the South Bohemian Region